Events in 1999 in animation.

Events

January
 January 4: The first episode of Ed, Edd n Eddy airs.
 January 21: Anime producer Yoshinobu Nishizaki is sentenced to two years and eight months in prison for a drug possession case of two years ago.
 January 22: In Sweden the first episode of De tre vännerna och Jerry (The Three Friends and Jerry) premiers. 
 January 25: The first episode of Zoboomafoo airs.
 January 29: The Japanese animation studio TNK is founded.
 January 31: The first episode of Family Guy airs.

February
 February 1: Anime producer Yoshinobu Nishizaki is arrested after a handgun, 131 bullets and 20 grams of stimulant drugs were seized from his house in Setagaya Ward, Tokyo.  Nishizaki, voluntarily submitted two automatic rifles, 1,800 bullets, and 30 howitzer shells kept in a station wagon in his garage, police said.  Police say that Nishizaki had hidden an Austrian handgun loaded with three bullets under a zaisu chair in a study. Nishizaki told them that he had bought the handgun in Hong Kong 10 years earlier.
 February 2: Nickelodeon and the Children’s Television Workshop (now known as Sesame Workshop) launches Noggin, a commercial-free brand aimed at children aged 6–12.
 February 14: The Simpsons episode "I'm with Cupid" premieres, guest starring Elton John.

March
 March 26: 71st Academy Awards: 
 Bunny by Chris Wedge wins the Academy Award for Best Animated Short Film.
 When You Believe by Stephen Schwartz from The Prince of Egypt wins the Academy Award for Best Original Song.
 March 28: The first episode of Futurama airs. It marks the debut of characters Philip J. Fry, Professor Farnsworth, Leela and Bender. The first episode also guest stars television personality Dick Clark and actor Leonard Nimoy.

April
 April 4: The Simpsons episode "Simpsons Bible Stories" debuts.
 April 27: The Futurama episode "A Fishful of Dollars" premieres, guest starring actress and model Pamela Anderson.
 Specific date unknown: The first Animation Masters Summit is organized in India.

May
 May 1: The first episode of SpongeBob SquarePants airs.
 May 9: The Simpsons episode "They Saved Lisa's Brain" premieres, guest starring Stephen Hawking.
 May 11: The Futurama episode "A Big Piece of Garbage" premieres, guest starring inventor Ron Popeil.
 May 16: The Simpsons episode "Thirty Minutes over Tokyo" premieres, in which the family travels to Japan.
 May 22: Aleksandr Petrov's The Old Man and the Sea premiers.
 May 18: The Futurama episode "Hell Is Other Robots" premieres, guest starring musicians Mike Diamond and Adam Horovitz from the Beastie Boys.
 Specific date unknown: Gene Fowler founds animation studio Fatkat, which will last until May 2009.

June
 June 12: The Walt Disney Company releases Tarzan.
 June 30: A film adaptation of South Park, named South Park: Bigger, Longer & Uncut premieres.

July
 July 28: André Franquin's heirs and copyright holders win the trial against the Walt Disney Animation Studios over their animated TV series version of Franquin's comics character Marsupilami, citing breaches of its license contract: Disney had failed to produce thirteen half-hour episodes (instead producing six to eight minute shorts) or use its "best efforts" to secure a commitment from a network to air the show, and it launched its marketing campaign during a time when the show was not being broadcast. Marsu also accused Disney of fraudulent concealment; the judge noted that Disney had decided to not devote sufficient resources to the Marsupilami project, and had concealed this fact from Marsu. Disney pays back the damage and hands the rights to the series back to Franquin's company Marsu Productions.

August
 August 6: The Iron Giant premieres, but doesn't do well at the box office. It will only become a cult classic later.

September
 September 6: The first episode of Dragon Tales airs and PBS Kids launches.
 September 24: John Kricfalusi's Boo Boo Runs Wild, a parody of Yogi Bear, first airs.
 September 26: The Simpsons episode "Beyond Blunderdome" premieres, guest starring Mel Gibson.

October
 October 4: The infamous Arthur episode "Arthur's Big Hit" premieres.

November
 November 12: The first episode of Courage the Cowardly Dog airs.
 November 13: Toy Story 2 premiered in theaters.
 November 16: Duck Amuck is added to the National Film Registry.

December 
 December 12: The Futurama episode "A Head in the Polls" premieres, guest starring model Claudia Schiffer.
 December 17: The Walt Disney Company releases Fantasia 2000, a sequel to the 1940 film Fantasia.
 December 19: The Futurama episode "Xmas Story" premieres, guest starring television host Conan O'Brien and actor John Goodman.
 December 24: The first episode of Happy Tree Friends airs.

Specific date unknown
 Atomic Cartoons is founded.
 Augenblick Studios is founded.
 Cartoon Saloon is founded. 
 JibJab is founded.
 Mark Baker releases Jolly Roger.

Films released 

 January 10 - Batman Beyond: The Movie (United States)
 January 12 - Our Friend, Martin (United States)
 February 26 - Babar: King of the Elephants (Canada, France, and Germany)
 March 6 - Doraemon: Nobita Drifts in the Universe (Japan)
 March 9 - Tarzan of the Apes (United States)
 March 19 - The King and I (United States)
 March 20 - Gundress (Japan)
 March 26 - Doug's 1st Movie (United States)
 April 1 - Millionaire Dogs (Germany)
 April 2 - Marco: 3000 Leagues in Search of Mother (Japan)
 April 17:
 Case Closed: The Last Wizard of the Century (Japan)
 Crayon Shin-chan: Explosion! The Hot Spring's Feel Good Final Battle (Japan)
 The Legend of the Titanic (Italy)
 April 23 - City Hunter: Death of the Vicious Criminal Ryo Saeba (Japan)
 April 24:
 Tenchi Forever! The Movie (Japan)
 You're Under Arrest: The Movie (Japan)
 June 2 - A Monkey's Tale (France, United Kingdom, Germany, and Hungary)
 June 16 - Tarzan (United States)
 June 23 - Faeries (United Kingdom)
 June 30 - South Park: Bigger, Longer & Uncut (United States)
 July 6 - Puss in Boots (United States)
 July 8 - Manuelita (Argentina)
 July 9 - Goomer (Spain)
 July 10 - Carnivale (France and Ireland)
 July 17:
 My Neighbors the Yamadas (Japan)
 Pokémon: The Movie 2000 (Japan)
 July 24 - Soreike! Anpanman Yūki no Hana ga Hiraku Toki (Japan)
 July 27:
 Happy Birthday: Inochi Kagayaku Toki (Japan)
 VeggieTales: Larry-Boy and the Rumor Weed (United States)
 July 30:
 Lotus Lantern (China)
 Lupin III: The Columbus Files (Japan)
 July 31 - The Emperor's Treasure (United States)
 August 3 - Madeline: Lost in Paris (United States)
 August 6 - The Iron Giant (United States)
 August 14:
 Cyber Team in Akihabara: Summer Vacation of 2011 (Japan)
 Revolutionary Girl Utena: Adolescence of Utena (Japan)
 August 21:
 Cardcaptor Sakura: The Movie (Japan)
 The File of Young Kindaichi 2: Murderous Deep Blue (Japan)
 September 4 - Pippi Longstocking: Pippi's Adventures in the South Seas (Sweden)
 September 16 - Werner – Volles Rooäää!!! (Germany)
 September 25 - Break-Age (Japan)
 September 28 - Alvin and the Chipmunks Meet Frankenstein (United States)
 September 30 - Tobias Totz and His Lion (Germany)
 October 5 - Scooby-Doo! and the Witch's Ghost (United States)
 October 11:
 Jack and the Beanstalk (United Kingdom)
 Shōta no Sushi: Kokoro ni Hibiku Shari no Aji (Japan)
 October 19 - The Nuttiest Nutcracker (United States)
 October 22 - Anne Frank's Diary (United Kingdom, Ireland, France, Netherlands, and Luxembourg)
 November 9:
 Mickey's Once Upon a Christmas (United States)
 Winnie the Pooh: Seasons of Giving (United States)
 November 16 - Bartok the Magnificent (United States)
 November 17 - Jin-Roh: The Wolf Brigade (Japan)
 November 24 - Toy Story 2 (United States)
 December 3 - Cartoon Noir (United States)
 December 9 - An American Tail: The Mystery of the Night Monster (United States)
 December 10 - Dexter's Laboratory: Ego Trip (United States)
 December 16:
 Captain Bluebear: The Film (Germany)
 Mishy and Mushy (Hungary)
 December 17:
 Fantasia 2000 (United States)
 Olive, the Other Reindeer (United States)
 December 21 - Wakko's Wish (United States)
 December 23 - Kochira Katsushika-ku Kameari Kōen Mae Hashutsujo: The Movie (Japan)
 December 24 - Samurai Shodown 2: Asura Zanmaeden (Japan)
 December 25 - Pettson & Findus – The Cat and the Old Man Years (Sweden)
 December 27 - Die Reise zum Mond (China and Germany)
 Specific date unknown:
 D4: The Trojan Dog (Australia)
 Donkey Kong Country: The Legend of the Crystal Coconut (United States and Canada)
 Snow White and the Frog King (China)
 The Three Little Pigs (Australia)
 Zeno – For the Infinity of Love (Japan)

Television series debuts

Television series endings

Births

January
 January 1: Diamond White, American singer and actress (voice of Frankee Greene in Transformers: Rescue Bots, Fuli in The Lion Guard, Ruby in Sofia the First, Lunella Lafayette / Moon Girl in Moon Girl and Devil Dinosaur).
 January 4: Gage Munroe, Canadian actor (voice of George Ridgemount in Stoked, Matt in My Big Big Friend, the title character in Mr Moon, Jake in Babar and the Adventures of Badou, the title character in Justin Time, Marshall in season 1 of PAW Patrol, Danny Chase in Lucky Duck, Jim Hawkins in Pirate's Passage, Prince Ferg in Little Charmers, Hank in Hotel Transylvania: The Series, Dragon in the Super Why! episode "The Big Game", Steve in the Doodlebops Rockin' Road Show episode "Stand Up Funny", Mickey Mallory in the Grojband episode "Super Zeroes", Mikey in the Ella the Elephant episode "Ella's Special Delivery", Wayne Whale in the Little People episode "Potty Ahoy!").
 January 28: Preston Strother, American actor (voice of Fox in Ni Hao, Kai-Lan, Arthur Jr. in Batman: The Brave and the Bold).

February
 February 7: Bea Miller, American singer and actress (voice of Molly in Toy Story 3, Virginia in Yes, Virginia).
 February 19: Quinn Lord, Canadian actor (voice of Young Leo in Edison and Leo, Jason in 3-2-1 Penguins!, Linus Van Pelt in Peanuts Motion Comics, Hardy the Hippo in the ToddWorld episode "Whatever Sways Your Swing").

April
April 6: Kwesi Boakye, American actor (voice of Darwin Watterson in seasons 1-3 of The Amazing World of Gumball, Gossamer in The Looney Tunes Show, Benji Nichols in Costume Quest, Mr. Hoppy in Ni Hao, Kai-Lan, Newspaper Boy in The Princess and the Frog, Andrew in the Special Agent Oso episode "Thunderbubble", additional voices in Happy Feet).

May
 May 28: Cameron Boyce, American actor (voice of Jake in seasons 2-3 of Jake and the Never Land Pirates, Carlos in Descendants: Wicked World, Luke Ross in the Ultimate Spider-Man episode "Halloween Night at the Museum", Shocker in the  Spider-Man episode "Osborn Academy"), (d. 2019).
 May 30: Sean Giambrone, American actor (voice of Jeff Randell in Clarence, Ant-Man in Spidey and His Amazing Friends, Richardson Mole in Big Hero 6: The Series, Travis in The Emoji Movie, Shermy in the Adventure Time episode "Come Along With Me").

June
 June 3: Alicia Vélez, Mexican voice actor and daughter of Humberto Vélez (dub voice of Boo in Monsters, Inc., Daisy in Spirit Riding Free, Lena De Spell in DuckTales, Karmi in Big Hero 6: The Series, Pippa Powers in Mickey and the Roadster Racers, Shiera Sanders in DC Super Hero Girls, Martin Prince and Sherri and Terri in season 32-present of The Simpsons, Doctor Octopus in Spidey and His Amazing Friends).
 June 27: Chandler Riggs, American actor and DJ (voice of Carl Grimes in the Robot Chicken episode "The Robot Chicken Walking Dead Special: Look Who's Walking").

July
 July 9: Claire Corlett, Canadian actress (voice of Sweetie Belle in My Little Pony: Friendship is Magic, Tiny Pteranodon in Dinosaur Train).
 July 30: Joey King, American actress (voice of Katie in Horton Hears a Who!, Jessie Alden in The Boxcar Children and The Boxcar Children: Surprise Island, Gigi in Yellowbird, Fred in Hamster & Gretel).

August
 August 22: Ricardo Hurtado, American actor (voice of Hector "High Five" Nieves in Glitch Techs, Rich Belcher in Ron's Gone Wrong).

September
 September 7: Michelle Creber, Canadian actress and singer (voice of Apple Bloom in My Little Pony: Friendship is Magic).

November
 November 10: Michael Cimino, American actor (voice of Kevin Grant-Gomez in Hamster & Gretel, Eduardo in Moon Girl and Devil Dinosaur).
 November 23: Nikki Castillo, American actress (voice of Betsy and Sarah in Summer Camp Island, the title character in Pibby).

Deaths

January
 January 2: Shepard Menken, American actor (voice of Clyde Crashcup in The Alvin Show, Tonto in The Lone Ranger, the Spelling Bee and Chroma the Great in The Phantom Tollbooth, the title character in Riki Tiki Tavi, Doctor Doom in Spider-Man and His Amazing Friends, Old Storyteller in Bugs Bunny's 3rd Movie: 1001 Rabbit Tales), dies at age 77.
 January 11: John McGrew, American animator, painter and musician (Warner Bros. Cartoons), dies at age 88 or 89.
 January 12: Betty Lou Gerson, American actress (narrator in Cinderella, voice of Cruella de Vil in One Hundred and One Dalmatians), dies at age 84.

February
February 3: Herbert Klynn, American animator (UPA, founder of Format Films), dies at age 81.

March
 March 2: Hawley Pratt, American film director, lay-out artist, illustrator and animator (Walt Disney Company, Warner Bros. Cartoons, Hanna-Barbera, Filmation, DePatie-Freleng Enterprises), dies at age 87.

April
 April 1: Tadahito Mochinaga, Japanese animator and animation director (Manchukuo Film Association, Rankin/Bass), dies at age 80.
 April 3: 
 Evelyn Lambart, Canadian animator and film director (Begone Dull Care, A Chairy Tale), dies at age 84.
 Kay Wright, American animator, television producer and comics artist (Walt Disney Company, Cambria Productions, Filmation, Hanna-Barbera), dies at age 79.
 April 10: 
 Cliff Roberts, American photographer, cartoonist, animator and comics artist (Hanna-Barbera, DePatie-Freleng), dies at age 69.
 Jean Vander Pyl, American actress (voice of Wilma Flintstone and Pebbles Flintstone in The Flintstones, Rosie the Robot Maid in The Jetsons, Goldie, Lola Glamour, Nurse LaRue in Top Cat, Winsome Witch in The Secret Squirrel Show, Ogee in Magilla Gorilla), dies at age 79 from lung cancer.
 April 14: Vic Herman, American illustrator, designer, cartoonist, puppeteer, television producer, and comics artist (designed title cards for Merrie Melodies), dies at age 79.
 April 16: 
Regis Cordic, American actor (voice of Diablo in Fantastic Four, Apache Chief and Black Manta in The All-New Super Friends Hour, Bald Doctor in Puff the Magic Dragon, The Clock in The Mouse and His Child, Quintessons and Menasor in The Transformers), dies at age 72.
Charles McKimson, American animator and comics artist (Warner Bros. Cartoons), dies at age 84.

May
 May 8: Ed Gilbert, American actor (voice of Baloo in TaleSpin, Thrust and Blitzwing in The Transformers, Pugsy and Daddy Sterling in Tom and Jerry: The Movie, Mr. Smee in Peter Pan and the Pirates, Looten Plunder in Captain Planet and the Planeteers, Professor Heiny in Freakazoid!, Dormammu in Spider-Man, the Mandarin in season 1 of Iron Man), dies at age 67.
May 19: Candy Candido, American singer, musician, and actor (voice of the Native American chief in Peter Pan, Awful Dynn in The Phantom Tollbooth, crocodile captain in Robin Hood, Mafia messenger in Heavy Traffic, Sal in Hey Good Lookin', Fidget in The Great Mouse Detective), dies at age 85.

June
 June 11: DeForest Kelley, American actor (voice of Dr. Leonard McCoy in Star Trek: The Animated Series, Viking 1 in The Brave Little Toaster Goes to Mars), dies at age 79.
 June 13: Douglas Seale, English actor, film producer, and director (voice of Krebbs in The Rescuers Down Under, the Sultan in Aladdin), dies at age 85.
 June 21: Tobin Wolf, American writer (creator of ThunderCats), dies at age 76.

August
 August 7: Brion James, American actor (voice of Rudy Jones / Parasite in Superman: The Animated Series), dies at age 54.
 August 9: Lou Lilly, American animator and film director (Warner Bros. Cartoons), dies at age 90.
 August 14: David W. Allen, American animator (When Dinosaurs Ruled the Earth, Laserblast, The Howling, Twilight Zone: The Movie , Honey, I Shrunk the Kids, Puppet Master), dies at age 54.
 August 20: Margaret Wright, American actress (voice of Casey Junior in Dumbo), dies from heart failure at age 82.
 August 27: Ponsonby Britt, American fictional television producer (Jay Ward Productions, The Phox, the Box, and the Lox), was retired at age 40.

September
 September 22: George C. Scott, American actor (voice of Smoke in Cartoon All-Stars to the Rescue, Percival McLeach in The Rescuers Down Under), dies at age 71.

October
 October 15: Terry Gilkyson, American lyricist (wrote "The Bare Necessities" from The Jungle Book), dies at age 83.
 October 18: 
Dallas Bower, English film and television director and producer (Alice in Wonderland), dies at age 92.
Paddi Edwards, English actress (voice of Flotsam and Jetsam in The Little Mermaid, Twinkle the Bag Lady in Edith Ann: Homeless Go Home, Gloria in Phantom 2040, Lab Computer in The Brave Little Toaster to the Rescue, Satellite 1 in The Brave Little Toaster Goes to Mars, Atrophos in Hercules, Lucy in 101 Dalmatians: The Series, Vera in Pepper Ann, Maggie Pie in the Batman: The Animated Series episode "Eternal Youth"), dies at age 67.
 October 29: Greg, Belgian comics artist, writer and screenplay writer (Tintin and the Temple of the Sun, Tintin and the Lake of Sharks), dies at age 68.

November
 November 12: Mary Kay Bergman, American actress  (voice of the Bimbettes in Beauty and the Beast, Quasimodo's mother in The Hunchback of Notre Dame, Liane Cartman, Sheila Broflovski, Shelly Marsh, Sharon Marsh, Mrs. McCormick and Wendy Testaburger in South Park, Banshee in Extreme Ghostbusters, Barbara Gordon/Batgirl in Batman & Mr. Freeze: SubZero, Timmy Turner in Oh Yeah! Cartoons,  Gwen Stacy in the Spider-Man episode "Farewell Spider-Man", continued voice of Dr. Blight in Captain Planet and the Planeteers and Daphne Blake in Scooby-Doo), dies at age 38.
 November 14: Giorgio Bordini, Italian comics artist, animator and illustrator (La Piccola Fiammiferaia), dies at age 72.

December
 December 3: Madeline Kahn, American actress, comedian and singer (voice of Draggle in My Little Pony: The Movie, Gussie Mausheimer in An American Tail, Gypsy in A Bug's Life, Mrs. Shapiro in the Little Bill episode "The Campout"), dies at age 57.
 December 10: Al Stahl, American animator and comics artist (Terrytoons, Fleischer Brothers, Stahl's Animated Productions), dies at age 83.
 December 17: Rex Allen, American actor (narrator and voice of the title character in The Saga of Windwagon Smith, the narrator in Charlotte's Web), dies at age 79.
 December 31: 
Arthur Humberstone, English animator and film director (Halas & Batchelor, Animal Farm, Yellow Submarine, Watership Down, The Plague Dogs, The BFG), dies at age 87.
Dean Elliott, American composer (Chuck Jones, DePatie-Freleng Enterprises,  Ruby-Spears Enterprises), dies at age 82.

Specific date unknown
 Reg Hill, English model-maker, animator, director and producer (worked for Gerry Anderson), dies at age 85.

See also 
 1999 in anime

Sources

External links 
Animated works of the year, listed in the IMDb

 
1990s in animation